Hamshire is an unincorporated community in western Jefferson County, Texas, United States. It is part of the Beaumont–Port Arthur Metropolitan Statistical Area and located on State Highway 124 twenty miles southwest of Beaumont. It was probably named for Lovan Hamshire, who developed the land as early as the 1870s. Hamshire was on the Gulf and Interstate Railway with a post office being established there in 1897. A townsite plat was filed in 1911 by Theodore F. Koch. Another major land dealer, Herbert Roedenbeck, subdivided additional land south of the railroad later that year, giving the subdivision the name Hamshire Gardens. Although there was interest shown by local rice farmers, Hamshire had only fifty inhabitants in 1928. The Fannett (1927) and Stowell (1941) oil fields discovery initiated new development in western Jefferson County. By 1940, the population in Hamshire had grown to 200. Natural gas production at the Hamshire field also continued to be of major importance to the community's economy through the 1980s. By 1985 the community had an estimated 350 residents and twenty-two businesses. In 1990 the population remained an estimated 350.

Education
Residents are served by the Hamshire-Fannett Independent School District.

Hamshire-Fannett ISD is assigned to Galveston College in Galveston.

References

External links
 

Unincorporated communities in Jefferson County, Texas
Unincorporated communities in Texas
Beaumont–Port Arthur metropolitan area